KK Budućnost may refer to:
 KK Budućnost Bijeljina, basketball team based in Bijeljina, Bosnia and Herzegovina
 KK Budućnost Novi Sad, basketball team based in Novi Sad, Serbia
 KK Budućnost Podgorica, basketball team based in Podgorica, Montenegro
 KK Budućnost Valjevo, based in Valjevo, Serbia (1948–1954); former name of Metalac